is the southwestern portion of Gifu Prefecture in the Chūbu region of Japan. Before Gifu became a prefecture, the area was part of Mino Province. The borders of this region are not officially set, but it generally consists of the following cities and towns: Ōgaki, Kaizu, Gōdo, Wanouchi, Anpachi, Ibigawa, Ōno, Ikeda, Yōro, Tarui and Sekigahara.

Geography

The southern part of the region lies at sea level and connects to Aichi and Mie prefectures. The Kiso Three Rivers flow through the eastern part of the region and connect Seinō with the Gifu region and Aichi Prefecture.

Population
Approximately 300,000 people live in the Seinō region. Of those, about half live in the main city of Ōgaki.

Industries

The towns of Ibigawa, Ōno and Ikeda, as well as the city of Ōgaki, are known for their production of Fuyu (富有 Fuyū), a type of persimmon.

Ōgaki is also the home to major companies such as Ibiden Co., Seino Co., Pacific Industrial Co. and Ogaki Kyoritsu Bank. Other companies, including Seria Co., a 100-yen shop, also have a strong presence in the region.

See also
Gifu
Chūnō
Tōnō
Hida

References

Chūbu region
Geography of Gifu Prefecture